Greenside Tunnel is a former railway tunnel in Pudsey, West Yorkshire, England.

History 

Greenside Tunnel was built when the branch line from Stanningley to Pudsey Greenside was extended towards Laisterdyke, resulting in the line known as Pudsey Loop. The tunnel was opened in 1893 as an extension to the railway from the former Pudsey Greenside railway station which was originally built as a terminal station. Since the railway line closed on 15 July 1964, it has been out of use and has been fenced off. Around 2006, planning permission had been granted to fill in the tunnel and the adjoining cuttings, but work has not started yet.
Partial landfill has begun as of spring 2018. An application has been made to Leeds city council for complete full landfill as of October 2018

Description 

The tunnel is located west of the site of Pudsey Greenside railway station and of the bridge leading Carlisle Road across the former line, and east of a bridge of Smalewell Quarry track, beneath the Fox and Grapes public house. The tunnel has not been built in a straight line, but with a slight S-shaped curvature that nevertheless allows to keep at least one entrance in sight at any point of its route. Its opening was located near today's junction of Westroyd, Windmill Hill, and Smalewell Road, beneath an access road to some garages, but is now capped off.

The eastern portal is located below steep retaining walls on the south side of the approach cutting. Since closure of the line, it has been partly blocked by tipped spoil. Throughout the tunnel, amply-sized refuges in brick have been provided at regular intervals. The western portal is built from stone with buttresses and wing walls to each side.

References 

Tunnels in West Yorkshire
Rail transport in West Yorkshire
Railway tunnels in England